Ground Zero is the 1990 debut album of Indian band 13AD. The album was widely praised in the Indian press.

Track listing
All songs written by 13AD, except where noted.  Arranged by 13AD.
Cassette side A:
Bad Taste 5:10
Ground Zero (George Thomas, Jr.) 5:07
Desolate Prisoner 4:19
Your Company 5:14
Down Deep 3:30

Cassette side B:
Won’t Give Up 3:21
Revelation (Thomas, Jr.) 3:39
Fortune’s Domain 3:40
Can’t Make Up my Mind 4:23
City Blues 4:00
Rocking in Faith 4:19

References

1990 debut albums
13AD (band) albums